Steve Newman is a South African acoustic guitarist, and was a founder member of the popular African group Tananas. For thirty years Newman has been collaborating with fellow South African guitarist, Tony Cox. He is also one of The Aquarian Quartet, consisting of Tony Cox, Syd Kitchen (deceased 2011), Greg Georgiades and Steve Newman. He was a member of Mondetta, a self-described "world music group", with Gito Baloi (of Tananas) and Wendy Oldfield.

Discography

As Steve Newman
 Your Mother is Very Worried About You (1979) — out of print LP
 What Do You Want (1982) — solo and with Tony Cox; out of print LP
 101 Ways to Play the Acoustic Guitar (1983) with Tony Cox — out of print LP
 Man on the Jetty (1985) — out of print cassette (solo), recorded at Pearl Road Studios, London, by Doc Rowe
Tananas (1986) with Kathryn Locke — out of print cassette
 Planetarium Live (c. 1989) with Tony Cox — out of print cassette
 Alive at La Plaza (1993) with Tony Cox — out of print cassette
 About Time (2002) with Tony Cox
 Steve Newman (2004) — solo independent release
 The World in a Guitar (2004) with Aquarian Quartet & friends (Madala Kunene, Terence Scarr, Edi Nedilander, Ashish Joshi, Kesivan Naidoo, Errol Dyers)
 Flavour (2008) — solo

With Tananas
 Tananas (1989)
 Spiral (1990)
 Time (1992)
 Orchestra Mundo (1995)
 Unamunacua (1996)
 The Collection (1997)
 Seed (1999)
 Alive in Jo'burg (2001)

References

Living people
South African musicians
Acoustic guitarists
Year of birth missing (living people)